Pat Harrington may refer to:

Pat Harrington Sr. (1901–1965), Canadian actor
Pat Harrington Jr. (1929–2016), his son, American actor
Pat Harrington (soccer) (born 1965), Canadian soccer player
Pat Harrington (Australian footballer) (born 1929), Australian rules footballer

See also
Patrick Harrington (disambiguation)